Thomas Michael Hull (born June 30, 1952) is a former linebacker in the National Football League (NFL). He was drafted in the twelfth round of the 1974 NFL Draft by the San Francisco 49ers and played that season with the team. The following season, he played with the Green Bay Packers. Prior to playing in the NFL, Hull played at the collegiate level at Penn State University.

Hull's son, Mike, followed in his father's footsteps and committed to Penn State in 2008. He later signed with the Miami Dolphins in 2015.

See also
List of Green Bay Packers players

References

Sportspeople from Cumberland, Maryland
San Francisco 49ers players
Green Bay Packers players
American football linebackers
Penn State Nittany Lions football players
Players of American football from Maryland
1952 births
Living people